André Adam may refer to:

 André Adam (academic) (1911–1991), French sociologist specializing in Morocco
 André Adam (diplomat) (1936–2016), Belgian diplomat